Calliostoma rema is a species of sea snail, a marine gastropod mollusk in the family Calliostomatidae.

Description
The height of the shell attains 11 mm.

Distribution
This species occurs in the Pacific Ocean from Mazatlan, Mexico to Ecuador

References

External links
 To Encyclopedia of Life
 To World Register of Marine Species
 

rema
Gastropods described in 1933